Étienne Lombard (1869–1920) was a French otolaryngologist and surgeon who discovered the Lombard effect, in which a person's voice is involuntarily raised when speaking in a loud environment.

He was at the Lariboisiere Hospital, the first "oto-rhino-laryngologiste des Hopitaux" in France. He developed new surgical techniques and a new form of bone forceps. During World War I he researched the effects of air blasts upon 600 aviators but was unable to continue this research due to an illness that resulted in his early death.

The "symptom of the raised voice" was discovered in 1909. It was made possible by the invention of a device by the Viennese physician Robert Bárány that delivered an intense noise to only one ear and so allowed the monaural examination of the other ear. Using this device Lombard asked a person to start talking in conversation while hearing noise. He found that when the noise began, the person spoke louder, and when the noise stopped, the voice returned to a normal level.pp. 678–680

The finding was reported to the French Academy of Sciences in August 1909, and the following year in April to the French Academy of Medicine. However, in 1910 German publications attributed this discovery to Robert Bárány, which led to a dispute in print between them. Priority was established when the English physician, Donald Schearer, described how he carried news of the discovery from Paris to Vienna in November 1909.pp. 677–678 Bárány received the Nobel Prize in Physiology or Medicine in 1914, for other work.

Lombard's discovery is important for four reasons.
 It provides a means of detecting malingering by simulated hearing loss
 It underlies research into speech communication in noise (an important practical problem)
 It helps researchers understand how imitation and speaking are altered by auditory feedback
 It identifies a role in speech of processes involving servomechanism.

He is buried in the Père Lachaise Cemetery in Paris.

References

French otolaryngologists
1920 deaths
1869 births
Burials at Père Lachaise Cemetery